The Robinson Plantation House is a historic house in Clark, New Jersey built around 1690 on territory that was part of the Elizabethtown Tract, and was once part of Rahway. It was added to the National Register of Historic Places in 1974 as Seventeenth Century Clark House.  The owner of the house, Dr. William Robinson, was the first official landowner in Clark, NJ. He was one of only a few physicians in New Jersey at the time, and built a medicine room in the house to practice "Physick," a then-popular form of healing using plants and herbs. He also performed Chirurgery

The 17th century frame house is characterized by its rubble stone foundation and massive fireplace foundation in the cellar, chamfered and carved summer beam, steeply pitched roof, crenellated chimney, diamond-paneled casement windows and broad overhanging corner pendants.  A box-like winder staircase leads to the second floor, where Dr. Robinson's maps and last will are displayed.
A circa 1957 addition on the back contains modern utilities and the house was occupied as a residence until 1973, after which it became the Dr. Wm. Robinson Plantation & Museum.

The Squire Hartshorne House is another home from the 17th century located in Clark.

See also
Homestead Farm at Oak Ridge
List of the oldest buildings in New Jersey
National Register of Historic Places listings in New Jersey
National Register of Historic Places listings in Union County, New Jersey
The Robinson's Branch of the Rahway River.
 The Robinson's Branch Reservoir.

References

External links
 Dr. William Robinson Plantation Museum - official site

Clark, New Jersey
Houses on the National Register of Historic Places in New Jersey
Houses in Union County, New Jersey
Museums in Union County, New Jersey
Rahway, New Jersey
National Register of Historic Places in Union County, New Jersey
New Jersey Register of Historic Places